In game theory, a trigger strategy is any of a class of strategies employed in a repeated non-cooperative game.  A player using a trigger strategy initially cooperates but punishes the opponent if a certain level of defection (i.e., the trigger) is observed.

The level of punishment and the sensitivity of the trigger vary with different trigger strategies.

Trigger strategies

Grim trigger (the punishment continues indefinitely after the other player defects just once)
Tit for tat (the punishment continues as long as the other player defects)
Tit for two tats (a more forgiving variant of tit for tat)

References 
Textbooks and general reference texts

 Vives, X. (1999) Oligopoly pricing, MIT Press, Cambridge MA (readable; suitable for advanced undergraduates.)
 Tirole, J. (1988) The Theory of Industrial Organization, MIT Press, Cambridge MA  (An organized introduction to industrial organization)

Classical paper on this subject

 Friedman, J. (1971). A non-cooperative equilibrium for supergames, Review of Economic Studies 38, 1–12. (The first formal proof of the Folk theorem (game theory)).

Non-cooperative games